Berteștii de Jos is a commune located in Brăila County, Muntenia, Romania. It is composed of four villages: Berteștii de Jos, Berteștii de Sus, Gura Călmățui and Spiru Haret. It formerly included Gura Gârluței and Nicolești villages, now depopulated.

The Balta Mică a Brăilei Natural Park is partly situated on the administrative territory of the commune.

References

Communes in Brăila County
Localities in Muntenia